Dansk Melodi Grand Prix, also known as Melodi Grand Prix or simply DMGP, is an annual music competition organised by the Danish public broadcaster Danmarks Radio (DR) since 1957, which determines the  for the Eurovision Song Contest. The festival has produced three Eurovision winners and fourteen top-five placings.

History

With the introduction of a semi-final at the 2004 contest, and due to Denmark's absence from the 2003 contest, Denmark's 2004 representative, Tomas Thordarson, had to take part in the semi-final. His song, "Shame on You" did not reach the final, finishing 13th in a field of 22 contestants.

In 2005, DR made a bold step for Dansk Melodi Grand Prix. Artists were allowed, for the first time ever, to sing in a language other than Danish. Many of the entries that year were sung in English; however, against the odds, the winning song was sung in Danish. Jakob Sveistrup won Dansk Melodi Grand Prix with his song "Tænder på dig". It was later re-written for the Eurovision Song Contest 2005 to English as "Talking to You". Unlike the year before, Denmark secured a place in the final, finishing third in the semifinal. In the final he came 9th, guaranteeing Denmark a place in the final of the 2006 contest. A year later, Sidsel Ben Semmane sang "Twist of Love" in the final, but managed to finish 18th of 24 songs.

In 2007, after many poor results, Dansk Melodi Grand Prix adopted a semi-final format that had served well for the Swedish preselection, Melodifestivalen. Two semi-finals with 8 songs each were introduced, with the top 4 songs qualifying for the final. The 4 losing songs of each semi-final then took part in one of two wildcard rounds where the listeners of Danish radio stations P3 and P4 chose another two finalists. The winner under this new format, DQ with the song "Drama Queen" (a wildcard entrant), finished 18th in the semifinal, failing to qualify Denmark for the final again.

DR continued to use this format in the 2008 edition which was won by Simon Mathew and the song "All Night Long". At the Eurovision Song Contest 2008 in Belgrade, Serbia, Denmark as in 2005, finished 3rd in the semifinals, qualifying for the grand final. In the final, Mathew got 60 points, finishing 15th in a field of 25 songs.

For the 2009 of Dansk Melodi Grand Prix, DR reverted to their one-night final, that was held on 31 January 2009. The final of 10 songs consisted of 6 songs from an open call of songs from the public, with 4 songs being invited by DR to compete.

Winners
Almost all winners of Dansk Melodi Grand Prix have gone on to represent Denmark at Eurovision. Denmark has won Eurovision three times: in 1963, 2000 and 2013.

Albums

Main album series

Children's MGP album series

De vindere series

Others

See also
Dansk Melodi Grand Prix winners
Melodifestivalen
Melodi Grand Prix
Denmark in the Eurovision Song Contest
MGP Junior (Denmark)

Notes and references

Notes

References

External links

DR: Dansk Melodi Grand Prix
The Eurovision Song Contest National Finals Homepage

 
Eurovision Song Contest selection events
Denmark in the Eurovision Song Contest
Annual events in Denmark